Saïdia (Ajrud), known as the "Blue Pearl", is a beach town in northeastern Morocco near Berkane, in the great area of Beni Znassen. It is located in the province Berkane, near the Mediterranean Sea and at the Moroccan-Algerian border. Its 14 km (9 mile) coastline is one of the longest beaches of Morocco and is characterized by its golden sand and Mediterranean climate, making it a popular international tourist destination. It hosts numerous resorts and attractions, including private beach resorts, shopping malls, golf courses, and other sports centers.

Saïdia's marina covers an area of 290,000 square meters (70 acres), with 740 berths and modern marina facilities. Tourists are attracted by its traditional folk music festival every August. It is surrounded by a natural bird preserve of marsh and woodland called Moulouya National Parc. Access to the main beach is through a eucalyptus forest.

Climate 

Saïdia climate is semi-arid (Köppen climate classification: BSh). It is mild all year round, highly influenced by maritime winds. Autumn and winter are the wettest seasons, having more than 80% of total annual rainfall.

History 
The nucleus of Saïdia dates from 1883 and was the work of Sultan Hassan I, who built a 15,600-square-meter (3¾ acre) casbah (fortress) on the left bank of the mouth of the river Kiss. Its purpose was to monitor and regulate the movement of people to and from Algeria, which was then under French sovereignty. After Morocco became a French protectorate in 1913, Saïdia proved popular with French settlers and became a resort. After Moroccan independence, Saïdia continued to attract visitors and has become one of the country's most popular tourist attractions.

References

External links
 

Populated places in Berkane Province
Municipalities of Morocco
Morocco geography articles needing translation from French Wikipedia